Jannes-Kilian Horn (born 6 February 1997) is a German professional footballer who plays as a defender for  club 1. FC Nürnberg on loan from VfL Bochum.

Career
Horn spent his youth career at VfL Wolfsburg, where he was promoted to the first team during the 2016–17 season. In June 2017, Horn joined 1. FC Köln who had recently qualified for the UEFA Europa League.

On 15 August 2019, Horn joined Hannover 96 on a loan deal until the end of 2019–20 season. After Timo Hübers was infected with Covid-19, all Hannover 96 players were tested, but only Horn was tested positive. According to the club, his case had no connection to Hübers' case.

On 25 July 2022, Horn signed a two-year deal with VfL Bochum. On 7 January 2023, he moved on loan to 1. FC Nürnberg in 2. Bundesliga.

References

External links

Living people
1997 births
Sportspeople from Braunschweig
German footballers
Footballers from Lower Saxony
Association football defenders
Germany under-21 international footballers
Germany youth international footballers
Bundesliga players
2. Bundesliga players
Regionalliga players
VfL Wolfsburg II players
VfL Wolfsburg players
1. FC Köln players
Hannover 96 players
VfL Bochum players
1. FC Nürnberg players